The circuit intendant of Shanghai or the daotai of Shanghai, also formerly romanized as taotai or tao tai, was an imperial Chinese official who oversaw the circuit of Shanghai, then part of Jiangsu Province, in the Qing Empire. He oversaw the area's courts, law enforcement, civic defense, canals, and customs collection. As well as areas within modern Shanghai, his remit also included Qidong in present-day Jiangsu.

The position was only compensated at the  but, in addition to other sources of income, it was seen as a springboard to higher office within the empire.

History
The original seat of the circuit was at Taicang. It was moved to Shanghai in the 18th century. The first foreign settlement in Shanghai, the British Concession, was established by the Land Regulations undertaken on the initiative of the intendant Gong Mujiu. His was the one who signed it on behalf of the Qing government on 29 November 1845. Lin Gui approved the British consul Rutherford Alcock's proposal to extend the British boundary west from Barrier Road (today's Henan Rd.) to Thibet Road (now Xizang Rd.) on 27 November 1848. On 6 April 1849, he signed the agreement with Charles de Montigny formalizing and delineating the city's French Concession. An intendant was also involved with the establishment of the Shanghai International Settlement upon the merging of the British and American settlements in 1863.

The intendant was forced to flee the Small Sword Society in 1853 amid the chaos surrounding the Taiping Rebellion.

The intendants of the 1870s and '80s resisted French plans to expand their concession southwest, particularly the construction of a road through Shanghai's Ningbo Cemetery to connect the French Concession with Xujiahui (then "Siccawei"). One of the intendants in the 1890s finally yielded upon an agreement by the French to pay the duly assessed value of the land condemned, but the demolition of the cemetery walls in July 1898 prompted riots which killed twelve and the landing of French troops to protect the construction workers.

List

See also
 Mayor of Shanghai
 Old City of Shanghai

References

Citations

Bibliography
 .

History of Qing dynasty by region
Politics of Shanghai
History of Jiangsu